Conquest: Writhe is the second full length album from Swedish progressive metal band Burst.

Track listing

Credits 
Burst
Linus Jägerskog - Vocals
Patrik Hultin - Drums, Vocals
Jesper Liveröd - Bass, Vocals
Robert Reinholdz - Guitars, Vocals
Jonas Rydberg - Guitars

Production
Jesper Liveröd - Lyrics
Andreas Hedberg - Photography
Per Almqvist - Artwork, Design
Fredrik Reinedahl - Producer, Mixing, Engineering
Jonas Rydberg - Lyrics (Tracks 5, 6, 7)

2000 albums
Burst (band) albums